London or Paris, Berlin or Southend On Sea is the fourth live album released by the progressive rock group The Tangent. It was released as an "official bootleg" digital-only download from the band's website in late 2011 as both a DVD and CD. The DVD consists of a mix of audience video and video shot by the Riga's sound guy, Steve Cattermole, who decided to record the band's concert that night.

Track listing

Personnel 
 Andy Tillison - lead vocals and keyboards
 Luke Machi - guitars and vocals
 Dan Mash - bass guitar and vocals
 Tony "Funkytoe" Latham - drums

References 

The Tangent albums
2011 live albums
2011 video albums
Live video albums